Euleechia bieti is a moth of the family Erebidae. It was described by Charles Oberthür in 1883. It is found in China.

Subspecies
Euleechia bieti bieti (China: Sichuan, Shanxi)
Euleechia bieti hoenei (O. Bang-Haas, 1932) (China: Zhejiang)
Euleechia bieti minschani (O. Bang-Haas, 1932) (China: Gansu, Hebei)

References

Callimorphina
Moths described in 1883